Dominique Purdy (born 1984), better known by his stage name The Koreatown Oddity, is an American rapper, record producer, actor, writer, and former stand-up comedian from Koreatown, Los Angeles, California.

Early life
The Koreatown Oddity was born Dominique Purdy in 1984. He is originally from Koreatown, Los Angeles, California. He was raised by his mother, who introduced him to hip hop music. His parents never married and his father lived in Compton, California. While in high school, he performed at the Laugh Factory comedy club at night.

Career
The Koreatown Oddity started releasing his music in 2012. In 2014, he released a studio album, 200 Tree Rings, on New Los Angeles. In 2014, he released a collaborative album with Ras G, titled 5 Chuckles. LA Weekly included him on the "15 L.A. Bands to Watch in 2015" list. In 2015, he released a collaborative album with Mndsgn, titled Vivians. In 2016, he released another collaborative album with Ras G, titled 5 Chuckles: In the Wrld. In 2017, he released a studio album, Finna Be Past Tense, on Stones Throw Records. In 2020, he released a studio album, Little Dominiques Nosebleed, on Stones Throw Records. It received favorable reviews from AllMusic and Pitchfork. Complex included him on the "Best New Artists of the Month" list in June 2020. Anthony Fantano of The Needle Drop gave the album "a strong 8 to a light 9", and ranked it at number 11 on his Top Albums Of The Year list, raving over its rapping, production and subject matter. In 2022, he released a studio album, Isthisforreal?, on Stones Throw Records.

Discography

Studio albums
 No Health Insurance (2013)
 200 Tree Rings (2014)
 5 Chuckles (2014) 
 Vivians (2015) 
 5 Chuckles: In the Wrld (2016) 
 Finna Be Past Tense (2017)
 Little Dominiques Nosebleed (2020)
 Isthisforreal? (2022)

Mixtapes
 Eat a Dead Goat (2012)
 Buzzmixers Revenge (2012)
 Pops 45s (2012)
 Exit the Dragon's Mouth (2013)
 Snake Sheddings (2014)
 Off with the Horse (2015)
 Ram Be Gone (2016)
 A Monkey's Death (2017)
 A Beat at the Table (2018)
 Rooster (2018)
 That's a No from Me Dog (2019)
 When Pigs Fly (2020)
 Trapped Rats (2022)

Singles
 "Breastmilk" (2021)
 "Aggro Crag" (2022)
 "Misophonia Love" (2022)

Filmography

Feature films
 The Boys & Girls Guide to Getting Down (2006), Jonny
 Driving While Black (2015),  Dimitri

References

External links
 
 

1984 births
Living people
Rappers from Los Angeles
Record producers from Los Angeles
Male actors from Los Angeles
American male rappers
American hip hop record producers
21st-century American rappers
21st-century American male actors
Stones Throw Records artists
21st-century American male musicians